Robert Lindsay Percy (born 25 June 1947) is a former Australian rules footballer who played with Footscray in the Victorian Football League (VFL) and Williamstown in the Victorian Football Association (VFA).
		
After six games with Footscray, Percy moved to Williamstown where he played 135 games, winning premierships 1969 and 1976 and the Williamstown Best and Fairest award in 1976. He was later elected to the Williamstown Football Club Hall of Fame.

Notes

External links 
	

Robert Percy's playing statistics from The VFA Project	

Living people
1947 births
Australian rules footballers from Victoria (Australia)
Western Bulldogs players
Williamstown Football Club players